WRC 3: The Official Game of the FIA World Rally Championship (also known as WRC 2003) is a racing video game developed by Evolution Studios and published by Sony Computer Entertainment in 2003 as a part of the World Rally Championship series. The game was released for PlayStation 2 on November 21, 2003 in Europe, and later on May 27, 2004 in Japan (where it was published by Spike).

Gameplay 
WRC 3 features 17 drivers from 7 teams. Although Mitsubishi did not participate full-time in the championship this season, they appear on every event in the game and are therefore eligible to score team points in championship mode. Likewise, Hyundai appeared in each event despite withdrawing from the championship in real life towards the end of the season. All 14 rallies from the official 2003 WRC calendar appear on the game.

Reception

The game received "mixed" reviews according to the review aggregation website Metacritic.  In Japan, Famitsu gave it a score of one eight, one nine, one seven, and one eight for a total of 32 out of 40. In the UK, Official UK PlayStation 2 Magazine said that the game challenged Colin McRae, and listed it in their top 100 games.

References

External links
 

2003 video games
PlayStation 2 games
PlayStation 2-only games
Sony Interactive Entertainment games
Video games developed in the United Kingdom
World Rally Championship video games
Multiplayer and single-player video games
Evolution Studios games